Madipakkam Madhavan is a 2013 Indian Tamil-language comedy soap opera that aired on Kalaignar TV from on Monday through Saturday at 21:00 IST. The show stars by Ramji, Madhumitha, Nalini Harshitha and produced by Cine Star Media and  director by S.Mohan. It ended its run on 30 October 2015 after airing 458 episodes.

This serial re-telecast on Same Channel from April 17, 2017 to July 2019 airs Monday to Friday at 20:00 IST and It replaced Family drama Pokisham.

Plot
The story is based on a man having his mother and wife in the house. They fight on a regular basis, and sometimes his mother shouts without reason and starts an unwanted quarrel.

Cast
 Ramji as Madhavan 
 Madhumitha as Kausalya Madhavan
 Nalini as Pandari Bai and Rayalaseema Ramulamma (from episode 301 - 306) 
 Kathadi Ramamurthy as Kulothungan 
 Shanthi Anand as Janaki 
 R.Srimati as Savatri mami alis OC Mami
 Sheva Raj as Columbus
Bharathi Kannan as Vasudevan
 Sumangali as Kausalya's mother

Guest stars
 Monica
 Minnal Deepa

References

External links
 

Kalaignar TV television series
Tamil-language comedy television series
2013 Tamil-language television series debuts
2017 Tamil-language television series debuts
Tamil-language television shows
2015 Tamil-language television series endings